Gravesia is a genus of flowering plants belonging to the family Melastomataceae.

Its native range is western central tropical Africa. It is found in the countries of Congo, Gabon, Madagascar, Tanzania and Zaire.

The genus name of Gravesia is in honour of Louis Graves (1791–1857), French botanist, geologist and archaeologist and also director of waterways and forests in Oise in France. It was first described and published in Ann. Sci. Nat., Bot., séries 3, Vol.15 on page 333 in 1851.

Known species
According to Kew;

Gravesia aberrans 
Gravesia alata 
Gravesia albinervia 
Gravesia ambrensis 
Gravesia angustifolia 
Gravesia angustisepala 
Gravesia antongiliana 
Gravesia apiculata 
Gravesia barbata 
Gravesia baronii 
Gravesia bertolonioides 
Gravesia biauriculata 
Gravesia biporosa 
Gravesia bullosa 
Gravesia calliantha 
Gravesia capitata 
Gravesia cauliflora 
Gravesia cistoides 
Gravesia crassicauda 
Gravesia decaryana 
Gravesia dichaetantheroides 
Gravesia dionychifolia 
Gravesia distantinervia 
Gravesia diversifolia 
Gravesia ecalcarata 
Gravesia elongata 
Gravesia erecta 
Gravesia extenta 
Gravesia fulva 
Gravesia gabonensis 
Gravesia glandulosa 
Gravesia gunneroides 
Gravesia guttata 
Gravesia hederoides 
Gravesia heterophylla 
Gravesia hirtopetala 
Gravesia hispida 
Gravesia humbertii 
Gravesia humblotii 
Gravesia hylophila 
Gravesia ikongoensis 
Gravesia inappendiculata 
Gravesia jumellei 
Gravesia lamiana 
Gravesia lanceolata 
Gravesia laxiflora 
Gravesia lebrunii 
Gravesia longifolia 
Gravesia longipes 
Gravesia lutea 
Gravesia macrantha 
Gravesia macrophylla 
Gravesia macropoda 
Gravesia macrosepala 
Gravesia magnifolia 
Gravesia malvacea 
Gravesia mangorensis 
Gravesia marojejyensis 
Gravesia masoalensis 
Gravesia medinilloides 
Gravesia microphylla 
Gravesia minutidentata 
Gravesia mirabilis 
Gravesia nigrescens 
Gravesia nigro-ferruginea 
Gravesia oblanceolata 
Gravesia oblongifolia 
Gravesia parvifolia 
Gravesia parvula 
Gravesia pauciflora 
Gravesia pedunculata 
Gravesia peltata 
Gravesia pilosula 
Gravesia porphyrovalvis 
Gravesia primuloides 
Gravesia pterocaulon 
Gravesia pulchra 
Gravesia pusilla 
Gravesia pustulosa 
Gravesia ramosa 
Gravesia reticulata 
Gravesia retracticauda 
Gravesia rienanensis 
Gravesia riparia 
Gravesia rosea 
Gravesia rostrata 
Gravesia rotundifolia 
Gravesia rubiginosa 
Gravesia rubra 
Gravesia rubripes 
Gravesia rupicola 
Gravesia rutenbergiana 
Gravesia sambiranensis 
Gravesia scandens 
Gravesia scripta 
Gravesia serpens 
Gravesia serratifolia 
Gravesia setifera 
Gravesia stipulata 
Gravesia subglobosa 
Gravesia submalvacea 
Gravesia subsessilifolia 
Gravesia succosa 
Gravesia tanalensis 
Gravesia tetramera 
Gravesia tetraptera 
Gravesia thymoides 
Gravesia torrentium 
Gravesia tricaudata 
Gravesia variesetosa 
Gravesia velutina 
Gravesia venusta 
Gravesia vestita 
Gravesia viguieri 
Gravesia violacea 
Gravesia viscosa

References

Melastomataceae
Melastomataceae genera
Plants described in 1851
Flora of West-Central Tropical Africa